Luze may refer to:
Luže (Chrudim District), a town of the Czech Republic
Luzé, a commune in the French region of Centre
Luze, Haute-Saône, a commune in the French region of Franche-comté
Luže, Šenčur, a village in the Municipality of Šenčur, Slovenia